The UK Singles Chart is one of many music charts compiled by the Official Charts Company that calculates the best-selling singles of the week in the United Kingdom. Before 2004, the chart was only based on the sales of physical singles. This list shows singles that peaked in the Top 10 of the UK Singles Chart during 1994, as well as singles which peaked in 1993 and 1995 but were in the top 10 in 1994. The entry date is when the single appeared in the top 10 for the first time (week ending, as published by the Official Charts Company, which is six days after the chart is announced).

One-hundred and thirty-two singles were in the top ten in 1994. Nine singles from 1993 remained in the top 10 for several weeks at the beginning of the year, while "Another Day" by Whigfield, "Cotton Eye Joe" by Rednex, "Love Me for a Reason" by Boyzone, "Them Girls, Them Girls" by Zig and Zag and "Think Twice" by Celine Dion were all released in 1994 but did not reach their peak until 1995. "Twist and Shout" by Chaka Demus & Pliers, "The Perfect Year" by Dina Carroll and "It's Alright" by East 17  were the singles from 1993 to reach its peak in 1994. Twenty-five artists scored multiple entries in the top 10 in 1994. Boyzone, Oasis, R. Kelly, Red Hot Chili Peppers and Toni Braxton were among the many artists who achieved their first UK charting top 10 single in 1994.

The 1993 Christmas number-one, "Mr Blobby" by Mr Blobby remained at number-one for the first week of 1994. The first new number-one single of the year was "Twist and Shout" by Chaka Demus & Pliers featuring Jack Radics and Taxi Gang. Overall, fifteen different singles peaked at number-one in 1994, with Take That (2) having the most singles hit that position.

Background

Multiple entries
One-hundred and thirty-two singles charted in the top 10 in 1994, with one-hundred and twenty-one singles reaching their peak this year.

Twenty-five artists scored multiple entries in the top 10 in 1994. American singer Mariah Carey, East 17 and British boy-band Take That shared the record for the most top ten singles in 1994 with four hit singles each. Carey's cover of the Badfinger song "Without You" was her biggest hit of the year; it reached number-one in February and spent four weeks in that position, and eight weeks in the top 10 in total. Her other top ten singles were "All I Want for Christmas Is You" (number 2) in December; "Endless Love" (3) with Luther Vandross in September; and "Anytime You Need a Friend" (8) in June. Three of Take That's four top ten singles reached number-one in the UK: "Babe" in December 1993, "Everything Changes" in April and "Sure" in October. "Love Ain't Here Anymore" was their other top 10 entry, which reached number 3 in July. East 17 also had a number-one single in 1994, "Stay Another Day", which stayed there for 5 of its 8 weeks in the top ten. Their other top ten singles were "Around the World" and "It's Alright (both number 3) and "Steam" (number 7). Bon Jovi, Oasis and Eternal had three singles in the top ten in 1994.

D:Ream were one of a number of artists with two top-ten entries, including the number-one single "Things Can Only Get Better". Ace of Base, Celine Dion, Haddaway, Meat Loaf and Tori Amos were among the other artists who had multiple top 10 entries in 1994.

Chart debuts
Sixty-six artists achieved their first top 10 single in 1994, either as a lead or featured artist. Of these, seven went on to record another hit single that year: C. J. Lewis, D:Ream, The Mad Stuntman, Maxx, Reel 2 Real, Tori Amos and Whigfield. Oasis had two other entries in their breakthrough year.

The following table (collapsed on desktop site) does not include acts who had previously charted as part of a group and secured their first top 10 solo single.

Notes
Sting recorded his first top 10 single away from The Police, the collaboration with Bryan Adams and Rod Stewart, "All for Love", peaking at number two. He also had a solo single in 1994, "When We Dance", which made number nine. The B-52's (best known for their 1990 hit "Love Shack") appeared on the single "(We're) The Flintstones" under the name The B. C. 52's.

Absolutely Fabulous was a pseudonym used by the highly successful Pet Shop Boys to produce a song of the same name in aid of Comic Relief. Ali and Robin Campbell from the group UB40 guested on Pato Banton's cover of Baby Come Back, their first hit single away from the band.

Songs from films
Original songs from various films entered the top 10 throughout the year.  These included "All for Love" (from The Three Musketeers), "A Deeper Love" (Sister Act 2: Back In The Habit), "Streets of Philadelphia" (Philadelphia), "Mmm Mmm Mmm Mmm" (Dumb and Dumber), "Love Is All Around" (Four Weddings and A Funeral), "Baby, I Love Your Way" (Reality Bites), "(Meet) The Flintstones" (The Flintstones), "Regulate" (Above The Rim) and "We Have All the Time in the World" (Good Morning, Vietnam).

Charity singles
The Comic Relief single this year was performed by the Pet Shop Boys, who used the name Absolutely Fabulous for the single of the same name, which included lines of dialogue from the TV series. It peaked at number six on 18 June 1994 (week ending).

Best-selling singles
Wet Wet Wet had the biggest-selling single of 1994 with "Love Is All Around", which spent twenty weeks in the top ten (including fifteen weeks at number-one), sold over 1.783 million copies and was certified 2× platinum by the BPI. "Saturday Night" by Whigfield came in second place. East 17's "Stay Another Day", "Baby Come Back" from Pato Banton featuring Ali and Robin Campbell and "I Swear" by All-4-One made up the top five. Singles by Mariah Carey, Bon Jovi, Let Loose, D:Ream and Doop were also in the top ten best-selling singles of the year.

"Love is All Around" (3) ranked in the top 10 best-selling singles of the decade. It also stands as the tenth biggest-selling single of all time in the UK.

Top-ten singles
Key

Entries by artist

The following table shows artists who achieved two or more top 10 entries in 1994, including singles that reached their peak in 1993 or 1995. The figures include both main artists and featured artists, while appearances on ensemble charity records are also counted for each artist.

Notes

 "Another Day" reached its peak of number seven on 7 January 1995 (week ending).
 "Love Me for a Reason" reached its peak of number two on 7 January 1995 (week ending).
 "Cotton Eye Joe" reached its peak of number-one on 14 January 1995 (week ending).
 "Them Girls, Them Girls" reached its peak of number five on 1 January 1995 (week ending).
 "Things Can Only Get Better" originally peaked outside the top ten at number 24 upon its initial release in 1993.
 "I Like to Move It" re-entered the top 10 at number 10 on 12 March 1993 (week ending) for 8 weeks.
 "Don't Go Breaking My Heart" was recorded as a duet by Elton John and RuPaul for the John album Duets.
 "U R the Best Thing" originally peaked outside the top ten at number 72 upon its initial release in 1992. It also entered at a new peak of number 19 in April 1993.
 "Light My Fire" originally peaked outside the top ten at number 45 upon its initial release in 1993. It was remixed and re-released in 1994. 
 "Come on You Reds" was released by Manchester United F.C. to celebrate reaching the FA Cup Final in 1994.
 Status Quo collaborated on "Come on You Reds" but are not credited on the single's cover.
 Released as the official single for Comic Relief.
 'Absolutely Fabulous' was a pseudonym for Pet Shop Boys. The song "Absolutely Fabulous" borrowed lines from the television series of the same name.
 The B-52's were known as The B.C. 52's for their recording of "(Meet) The Flintstones" to match the setting of the film in the Stone Age.
 "Crazy for You" originally peaked outside the top ten at number 44 upon its initial release in 1993.
 DJ Miko's cover of "What's Up?" by 4 Non Blondes featured uncredited vocals from Louise Gard.
 The original version of "Girls Just Want to Have Fun" was released in 1984 and peaked at number 2. The 1994 version, entitled "Hey Now (Girls Just Want to Have Fun)", was a reggae-tinged arrangement of Lauper's original standard, with a musical tip of the hat to Redbone's "Come and Get Your Love".
 "We Have All the Time In the World" was covered by My Bloody Valentine for charity and use in a television advertising campaign for Guinness. The original version by Louis Armstrong was subsequently re-released, peaking at number three.
 "Power Rangers" was released during the airing of the first series of the television series Mighty Morphin Power Rangers in the UK and included several lines of dialogue from the show. 
 The song "Power Rangers" was performed by Aaron Waters (who had also composed the theme tune) but the Official Charts Company credits it to Mighty Morphin Power Rangers.
 "Another Day" re-entered the top 10 at number 7 on 7 January 1995 (week ending).
 Zig and Zag were puppet characters performed by Mick O'Hara and Ciaran Morrison, introduced on Irish television series Dempsey's Den but who found wider fame through Channel 4 series The Big Breakfast.
 Figure includes single that first chart in 1993 but peaked in 1994.
 Figure includes single that peaked in 1993.
 Figure includes single that peaked in 1995.
 Figure includes appearances on Reel 2 Real's "I Like to Move It" and "Go On Move".

See also
1994 in British music
List of number-one singles from the 1990s (UK)

References
General

Specific

External links
1994 singles chart archive at the Official Charts Company (click on relevant week)
Official Top 40 best-selling songs of 1994 at the Official Charts Company

United Kingdom
Top 10 singles
1994